Priit Suve (born Friedrich Johann Zube; 31 March 1901 Uulu Parish, Pärnu County – 20 April 1942 Sevurallag, Sverdlovsk Oblast) was an Estonian lawyer and politician. He was a member of Estonian National Assembly and the Mayor of Pärnu from 1939 until 1940..

References

1901 births
1942 deaths
Members of the Estonian National Assembly
Mayors of Pärnu
20th-century Estonian lawyers
People who died in the Gulag
Estonian people executed by the Soviet Union
University of Tartu alumni
People from Häädemeeste Parish